El Rio del Tiempo ("The River of Time") was a dark ride housed within the pyramid-shaped Mexico pavilion, in EPCOT Center at Walt Disney World Resort in Lake Buena Vista, Florida. The ride carried passengers on a slow boat ride through various scenes from Mexico's history. The scenes were filled with doll-sized Audio-Animatronic figures clad in authentic folk clothing, singing, dancing and playing music.

Synopsis
The ride began on a quiet river under an evening sky. It passed a volcano and continued on to scenes of native inhabitants. The ride continued with scenes of swimming, jumping into the ocean and relaxing at a bar. It would pass a Mexican shop, where merchants talked directly to the riders and tried to bargain with them. The finale was a fireworks filled night sky in modern-day Mexico City, with oversized marionettes dancing in a carousel.

Closure
El Rio del Tiempo closed on January 2, 2007 and was updated into a new ride titled Gran Fiesta Tour Starring The Three Caballeros in April 2007. The updated ride is based on the characters from the 1944 Disney film The Three Caballeros, including Donald Duck, Jose Carioca and Panchito Pistoles. The attraction's new story has Jose and Panchito searching for Donald across Mexico. It features much of the same settings as El Rio del Tiempo, and is located in the same place.

See also
 Epcot attraction and entertainment history

References

External links
 Walt Disney World Resort - Gran Fiesta Tour Starring The Three Caballeros

Amusement rides introduced in 1982
Amusement rides that closed in 2007
Former Walt Disney Parks and Resorts attractions
Epcot
Walt Disney Parks and Resorts gentle boat rides
Water rides
Audio-Animatronic attractions
1982 establishments in Florida
2007 disestablishments in Florida